How the Sith Stole Christmas is an animated fan film from that made its debut on the internet in December 2002. Written and directed by Ted Bracewell, the film tells the story of the Emperor's plans to invade the North Pole and take Santa Claus prisoner. Melvin the Elf ends up in the thick of things, and must help rescue Santa. Darth Vader is sent on a separate mission to destroy Christmas for the Ewok inhabitants of Endor, but when an unexpected chain of events leaves him stranded on the planet, Vader is confronted by a vision from the past and sent on an incredible journey through time and space.

The film parodies Dr. Seuss's How the Grinch Stole Christmas! by mixing it with elements of the Star Wars films, as well as parodying elements of The Hobbit, A Charlie Brown Christmas, and Citizen Kane. The film has a very distinct and lush look, as Bracewell animated the film himself using a combination of painted backgrounds, painted cutout characters, and 3D animation.

The released film is subtitled "Jingle Far, Far Away", and is the first part of a trilogy. A trailer has been released for Parts Two and Three ("Silent Night, Jedi Knight" and "A Very Vader Christmas"), but the finished episodes have yet to be released.

Part One has proven to be a popular download at TheForce.Net, and has screened at the DragonCon film festival and the 2004 Microcinema Fest. The film was highlighted as a "post-modern" fanfilm in an article on the genre in The Weekly Standard. The film was featured prominently in the September 2004 issue of Movie Magic Magazine, which called the film a "standout" in the genre.

References

External links
 Filmmaker's website
 How the Sith Stole Christmas at TheForce.net
 
 How the Sith Stole Christmas at iFilm
 How the Sith Stole Christmas review at The Fan Film Menace
 Ted Bracewell interview at The Fan Film Menace

2002 animated films
2002 films
American animated short films
2002 independent films
2002 short films
American independent films
Fan films based on Star Wars
Parody films based on Star Wars
American Christmas films
Films based on works by Dr. Seuss
Dr. Seuss parodies
Santa Claus in film
Films about elves
2000s English-language films
2000s American films